Hervé Bazile (born 18 March 1990) is a Haitian professional footballer.

Career
Bazile made his professional football debut on 11 November 2008 in a 2–4 loss to Bordeaux in the 2008–09 edition of the Coupe de la Ligue coming on as a substitute playing 24 minutes. He made his league debut a month later on 5 December 2008 in a 0–0 draw against Montpellier again appearing as a substitute.

International career
Bazile played on the France U-19 squad. He formally switched allegiance to the Haitian national football team, and was on reserve squad for the 2015 Gold Cup.

He made his Haiti national football team debut on 2 June 2019, in a friendly against El Salvador, as a starter.

International goals
Scores and results list Haiti's goal tally first.

Personal life
Bazile is of Haitian descent.

References

External links
 
 LFP Profile

1990 births
Living people
Sportspeople from Créteil
Association football defenders
French footballers
Haitian footballers
French sportspeople of Haitian descent
Citizens of Haiti through descent
En Avant Guingamp players
Amiens SC players
Stade Malherbe Caen players
Le Havre AC players
Ligue 1 players
Ligue 2 players
Championnat National players
France youth international footballers
Haiti international footballers
2019 CONCACAF Gold Cup players
Footballers from Val-de-Marne